Jessika Gedin, (born 12 April 1970 in Härnösand, Sweden) is a Swedish book publisher and radio/television presenter.

She founded the publishing company Koala Press and Tivoli publishing together with her sister Eva Gedin. She has worked as a literary translator and has been in the jury for the August award.

As a radio presenter Jessika Gedin is known for the show Spanarna at Sveriges Radio P1. On 29 June 2007 Gedin was a "Sommarpratare" in the Sveriges Radio show Sommar i P1. She became a television presenter when she started presenting the SVT show Babel in March 2012. She is also known for participating in the SVT entertainment show På spåret and as a guest panelist on Gomorron Sverige since 1993.

Jessika Gedin is the daughter of translator Lena Fries-Gedin and niece of the book publisher Per I. Gedin. She is in a relationship with the artist Pål Hollender. The couple has one daughter together who was born in 2004.

Translations 
Douglas Coupland: Livet efter Gud (Life after God) (Koala press, 1995)
Alan Warner: Morvern Callar (Morvern Callar) (Tivoli, 1999)
Douglas Coupland: Tio noveller (Tivoli, 2000)
Tim Burton: Voodooflickan och andra rysarsagor för vuxna (översatt tillsammans med Stephen Farran-Lee) (voli, 2001)
Nick McDonell: Nr tolv (Twelve) (Tivoli, 2003)
Douglas Coupland: Hej Nostradamus! (Hey Nostradamus!) (Norstedt, 2004)

References

1970 births
Living people
Swedish radio presenters
Swedish women radio presenters
Book publishers (people)
Swedish television hosts
Swedish women television presenters